Hadžić is a Bosnian surname, derived from the word hadži (hajji), referring to pilgrims to Mecca. Its bearers are predominantly Bosniaks. It may refer to:  

 Adnan Hadzic (born 1999), Norwegian footballer
 Aida Hadžić (born 1992), Bosnian footballer
 Anel Hadžić (born 1989), Bosnian footballer
 Antonije Hadžić (1831-1916), playwright and theatre director
 Azra Hadzic (born 1994), Australian tennis player
 Bahrija Nuri Hadžić (born 1904-1993), Bosnian soprano
 Benjamin Hadžić (born 1999), German-born Bosnian footballer
 Damir Hadžić (born 1978), Bosnian footballer
 Damir Hadžić (born 1984), Slovenian footballer
 Eldin Hadžić (born 1991), Bosnian footballer
 Elvir Hadžić (born 1999), Bosnian footballer
 Emir Hadžić (born 1984), Bosnian footballer
 Fadil Hadžić (1922-2011), Bosnian playwright, journalist and filmmaker (born in eastern Herzegovina)
 Goran Hadžić (1958-2016), Croatian Serb general accused of crimes against humanity
 Hakija Hadžić (1883-1953), Herzegovinian Muslim politician
 Irfan Hadžić (born 1993), Bosnian footballer
 Ismet Hadžić (1954-2015), Bosnian footballer
 Jovan Hadžić (1799-1869), Serbian writer
 Kenan Hadžić (born 1994), Croatian footballer of Bosniak origin
 Memnun Hadžić (born 1981), Bosnian boxer
 Nasiha Kapidžić-Hadžić (1932-1995), Bosnian writer
 Nedim Hadžić (born 1999), Bosnian footballer
 Olga Hadžić (1946-2019), Serbian mathematician
 Osman Nuri Hadžić (1869-1937), Bosnian writer
 Osman Hadžić (born 1966), Bosnian singer
 Sabit Hadžić (1957-2018), Bosnian basketball player
 Safet Hadžić (1968), Slovenian football manager
 Stevan Hadžić (1868-1931), Serbian general
 Tarik Hadžić (born 1994), alpine skier from Montenegro

See also
 Chatzi, Greek surname
 Manos Hatzidakis, Greek composer
 Gheorghe Hagi, Romanian footballer

Bosnian surnames
Croatian surnames
Serbian surnames